The 2009 season is the Pohang Steelers' 27th season in the K-League in South Korea. Pohang Steelers competed in the K-League, League Cup, Korean FA Cup, AFC Champions League and FIFA Club World Cup as winners of the 2009 AFC Champions League.

Squad

On loan

K-League

Regular season

Pld = Matches played; W = Matches won; D = Matches drawn; L = Matches lost; F = Goals for; A = Goals against; GD = Goal difference; Pts = Points

Championship

Korean FA Cup

League Cup

AFC Champions League

Group stage

Knockout stage

FIFA Club World Cup

Statistics

Appearances and goals

Statistics accurate as of match played 19 December 2009

Top scorers

Discipline

Transfers

In

Out

Loan out

Honours

Club
AFC Champions League Winners, Fair Play Award
K-League Cup Winners

Individual
K-League Best XI:  Shin Hwa-Yong,  Kim Hyung-Il,  Hwang Jae-Won,  Choi Hyo-Jin,  Denilson
K-League Cup Top Scorer:  Yoo Chang-Hyun (4 goals)
K-League Cup Top Assistor:  Cho Chan-Ho (3 assists)
Korean FA Cup Top Scorer:  Stevo (5 goals)
AFC Champions League MVP:  No Byung-Jun
FIFA Club World Cup Top Scorer:  Denilson (4 goals)

References

Pohang Steelers
2009